Ninov is a Slavic family name, may refer to:
David Ninov (born 1972),  Macedonian bishop
Orlin Ninov (born 1970), Bulgarian rower
Victor Ninov (born 1959), Bulgarian physicist
Viktor Ninov (born 1988), Bulgarian footballer